National Route 14 is a national highway in South Korea connects Geoje to Pohang. It established on 31 August 1971.

Main stopovers
 South Gyeongsang Province
 Geoje - Tongyeong - Goseong County - Changwon - Gimhae
 Busan
 Gangseo District (Jukdong-dong)
 South Gyeongsang Province
 Gimhae (Buwon-dong ・Samjeong-dong)
 Busan
 Gangseo District (Sikman-dong)
 South Gyeongsang Province
 Gimhae (Bulam-dong)
 Busan
 Gangseo District - Buk District - Dongnae District - Geumjeong District - Haeundae District - Gijang County
 Ulsan
 Ulju County - Nam District - Ulju County - Nam District - Jung District - Ulju County
 North Gyeongsang Province
 Gyeongju - Pohang

Major intersections

 (■): Motorway
IS: Intersection, IC: Interchange

South Gyeongsang Province

Busan·Gimhae 

  Motorway section
 Gangseo District Gangdong Bridge ~ Sikman JCT (Dongseo-daero)

Ulsan 

  Motorway
 Nam District Duwang IS ~ Ulju County Cheongnyang-myeon Yulri Bus Garage (Cheongnyang-ro)

North Gyeongsang Province

References

14
Roads in South Gyeongsang
Roads in North Gyeongsang
Roads in Ulsan
Roads in Busan